7 Hours to Go is a 2016 Indian thriller film released on 24 June 2016 written & directed by Saurabh Varma. Produced by Krian Pictures, the film stars Shiv Panditt, Sandeepa Dhar, Nataša Stanković and Varun Badola Inspired by true event, the film revolves around a hostage crisis and what happens within 7 hours after that incident.

Actress Sandeepa Dhar got hard training of MMA (Mixed Martial Art) for playing a brave cop role in the film. She said "I am inspired by Tiger Shroff to get training in martial arts."

Cast
 Shiv Panditt as Arjun Ranawat 
 Sandeepa Dhar as ACP Nandini Shukla
 Nataša Stanković as Maya
 Varun Badola as Ramesh Dhadke
 Rohit Vir as Kabir Khemka
 Himanshu Malik as Tamim Chakri
 Aakash Dabhade as Inspector Ghorpale
 Vipin Sharma as Inder Kumar Gujral (IK)

Plot
Arjun (Shiv Panditt) comes to Mumbai to visit his fiancé Maya (Nataša Stanković). He reaches the City court to meet her and is taken aback when he is not able to find her anywhere.

He begins to search for Maya and in an unexpected turn, witnesses an unlikely murder. Frantic and exasperated, he is left with no choice but take passersby as hostages before he is framed as the killer.

The cops try to tackle the situation and within no time realize that Arjun is no ordinary hostage-taker and it seems next to impossible to apprehend him.

Now, with nothing to lose, Arjun lays down his terms. He gives 7 hours to police to find out the killer. How ACP Nandini Shukla (Sandeepa Dhar) and Ramesh Dhadke (Varun Badola) will end this?

The clock ticks and the investigation begins...

Soundtrack

The soundtrack of 7 hours to go consists of 5 songs composed by Sugat – Shubham and Hanif Shaikh.

Critical reception

Mohar Basu of The Times of India gave the film a rating of 2 out of 5 saying that, "7 Hours To Go is gimmicky, lacking both the smarts and the menace of a thriller. The screenplay moves at snail's pace and is completely devoid of tension." Nandini Ramnath of Scroll said that the film is "An incompetent thriller with tacky effects." Rohit Bhatnagar of Deccan Chronicle gave the film a rating of 2.5 out of 5 and said that, "‘7 Hours To Go’ will leave you tangled in a poorly woven web of multiple mysteries. The first half raises your expectations from the film, but all falls flat in the second half." Sankhayan Ghosh of The Hindu said that 7 Hours To Go is "A Mumbai-based hostage movie that has zero tension and an empty emotional core. The film's biggest failure is to not make us care for any of the characters: all victims of terrible crimes." Sarita Tanwar of DNA India gave the film a rating of 2 out of 5 and criticized the director Saurabh Varma saying that, "In a thriller like this, the progression in the script needs to be very effective to keep the viewer engaged. Varma loses control of that in the film's second half. It's almost like he didn't know how to fill the gaps."

References

External links 
 

2016 films
2010s Hindi-language films
Hindi-language thriller films